Ergosterol peroxide (5α,8α-epidioxy-22E-ergosta-6,22-dien-3β-ol) is a steroid derivative. It has been isolated from a variety of fungi, yeast, lichens and sponges, and has been reported to exhibit immunosuppressive, anti-inflammatory, antiviral, trypanocidal  and antitumor activities in vitro.

References 

Sterols
Organic peroxides